Gözler  is a town in the Pamukkale district (Denizli) of Denizli Province, Turkey. The population of gözler was 2010. as of 2012. The town was founded in 1971 at a different location. In 1976 it moved to its present location. Main agricultural product of the town is thyme.

References

Populated places in Denizli Province
Towns in Turkey
Pamukkale District